Theodore Philip Toynbee (25 June 1916 – 15 June 1981) was a British writer and communist. He wrote experimental novels, and distinctive verse novels, one of which was an epic called Pantaloon, a work in several volumes, only some of which are published. He also wrote memoirs of the 1930s, and reviews and literary criticism, the latter mainly via his employment with The Observer newspaper.

Life
He was born in Oxford; his father was the historian Arnold J. Toynbee, and his mother was Rosalind Murray. He was educated at Rugby School, where he became rebellious, reacting against the public school system. Inspired by the example of Esmond Romilly, later a friend, he ran away, returned shortly and was expelled. He later wrote a memoir of Romilly, and Jasper Ridley (1913–1944), entitled Friends Apart. Through Romilly, Toynbee met Jessica Mitford, who became a close friend after Esmond died in WWII. He was also influenced by bookshop owner and would-be encourager of the young radical element, David Archer, whom he met through David Gascoyne.

At Christ Church, Oxford in the late 1930s he became the first communist president of the Oxford Union, at the height of communism's apparent success and social acceptability. He visited Spain at the end of 1936, at the start of the Spanish Civil War, in a student delegation. He was said to have been beaten up by Mosley's Blackshirts at a fascist meeting. In 1938–39 he edited the Birmingham Town Crier.

He married twice: in 1939, to Anne Powell and in 1950, Sally Smith. In the early 1940s Philip and Anne lived a bohemian life in London's Fitzrovia, and Philip was drinking heavily. At that time they knew Lucian Freud, Donald Maclean and Robert Kee, Henrietta Moraes and others from David Tennant's Gargoyle Club in Soho. Toynbee was later to be found, with Benedict Nicolson, in the Wednesday Club consisting of raffish male writers, artists and journalists. In 1945 they moved to the Isle of Wight, for a fresh start. They had two children, the second being Mary Louisa, better known as the journalist Polly Toynbee. Anne later married Richard Wollheim shortly after divorcing Philip in 1950. As a foreign correspondent with The Observer, Philip then traveled to Tel Aviv, where he met Sally, who was a secretary for the American Embassy there.

During the 1950s he continued to work for The Observer, and was one of the more prominent intellectual figures in British life (perhaps to be compared with Edmund Wilson in the United States, for example). In an article written for The Observer in 1961, he notoriously proclaimed the irrelevancy of J.R.R. Tolkien's The Lord of the Rings, just prior to its paperback publication in America and subsequent cultural phenomenon:

"There was a time when the Hobbit fantasies of Professor Tolkien were being taken very seriously indeed by a great many distinguished literary figures. Mr. Auden is even reported to have claimed that these books were as good as War and Peace; Edwin Muir and many others were almost equally enthusiastic. I had a sense that one side or the other must be mad, for it seemed to me that these books were dull, ill-written, whimsical and childish. And for me this had a reassuring outcome, for most of his more ardent supporters were soon beginning to sell out their shares in Professor Tolkien, and today those books have passed into a merciful oblivion."

In the early to mid-1970s, Toynbee underwent a personal crisis, slowly entering into a period of deep depression. He had become increasingly concerned about ecological matters and this, along with his own ideological temperament, led him to the controversial decision to set up a self-sufficient farming community. His family and friends thought this decision to be close to insane, considering as they did his privacy and routine-loving nature. The community quickly became a commune when Toynbee, Sally and their youngest daughter moved out, into a large cottage nearby. Nonetheless Toynbee and Sally continued to have a great deal of contact with the communards, and along with both spouses' active alcoholism, it frequently caused considerable tension in their marriage.

Toynbee's depression was sometimes immobilising and prevented him from enjoying his day-to-day life and work, and the regularity of his book reviews was sometimes interrupted as he struggled with the depression and the treatment he insisted on receiving for it – against the advice of his GP and consultant – namely, ECT (Electroconvulsive therapy). He finally got the go-ahead for the treatment, which he received in Bristol in the summer of 1977.

The two books which followed the ECT consisted of the journal writings which Toynbee decided to edit and send off for publication. These largely revolved around his search for some kind of spiritual meaning. It could be said that this arose out of his wish to find some purpose for the deep misery of his worst depression. He was strongly urged to stop drinking alcohol and occasionally managed short periods of abstinence. Yet he never really wanted long-term abstinence enough to make any real success of this. He was as a whole capable of great self-discipline, but needed to want his objectives with intense singular-mindedness in order to achieve them.

The two journal books were entitled Part of a Journey (covering 1977 to 1979) and End of a Journey (1979 to 1981). They were generally well received. For many readers, his best writing style shone throughout those pages, with its ready humility and gentle self-mockery.

He died at his home in St Briavels, Gloucestershire, with most of his family (he had five children altogether) at his bedside.

Toynbee genealogy
The Toynbees have been prominent in British intellectual society for several generations (note that this diagram is not a comprehensive Toynbee family tree):

Works
The Savage Days (1937)
A School in Private (1941)
The Barricades (1943)
Tea with Mrs. Goodman (1947) (U.S. edition title: Prothalamium: A Cycle of the Holy Graal)
The Garden to the Sea (1953)
Friends Apart: A Memoir of Esmond Romilly & Jasper Ridley in the Thirties (1954) re-published in (1980)
The Fearful Choice: a debate on nuclear policy (1958)
Pantaloon or the Valediction  (1961) verse novel
Underdogs: Anguish and Anxiety, Eighteen Men and Women Write Their Own Case-Histories (1962) editor
Comparing Notes: A Dialogue Across a Generation (1963) with Arnold J. Toynbee
Thanatos, a Modern Symposium at which Nine Characters Argue at Quarles (1963) with Maurice Richardson
Two Brothers: the fifth day of the Valediction of Pantaloon (1964) Pantaloon verse novel
A Learned City: the sixth day of the valediction of pantaloon (1966) Pantaloon verse novel
Views from a Lake: the seventh day of the Valediction of Pantaloon (1968) Pantaloon verse novel
Age of the Spirit: Religion as Experience (1973)
Distant Drum: Reflections on the Spanish Civil War (1976) editor
Part of a Journey: An Autobiographical Journal, 1977-79 (1981)
End of a Journey An Autobiographical Journal 1979-81 (1982)
Towards the Holy Spirit: A Tract for the Times (1982)

Notes

References
Faces of Philip; a memoir of Philip Toynbee (1984) Jessica Mitford

1916 births
1981 deaths
British communists
Deaths from cancer in England
Converts to Anglicanism from atheism or agnosticism
English Anglicans
English non-fiction writers
People from Oxford
The Guardian journalists
20th-century English poets
English male poets
People from St Briavels
Presidents of the Oxford Union
Toynbee family